Story of Me is the debut studio album by English singer Megan McKenna, released on 7 December 2018 through FrtyFve. The album was preceded by three singles; "High Heeled Shoes", "History" and "Everything but You". The album peaked at number four on the UK Country Chart.

Singles
The lead single from Story of Me, "High Heeled Shoes", was released on 6 September 2017, after the third and final episode of her reality series, There's Something About Megan. The single was accompanied by "Far Cry from Love", as part of an EP. The two songs topped the UK iTunes chart, just 24 hours after their release. The song reached number 43 on the UK Singles Chart, with "Far Cry from Love" reaching number 53. A music video directed by Oliver Prout was released on McKenna's YouTube channel on 20 September 2017. The second single, "History", was released on 20 March 2018. The third single, "Everything But You" was released shortly afterwards on 13 July 2018. In October 2019, McKenna began competing in The X Factor: Celebrity, and for her audition, she performed "Everything but You".

Track listing

Charts

Release history

References

2018 debut albums
Country albums by English artists
Megan McKenna albums